Armstrong H. Musgrove (March 26, 1854 – March 28, 1940) was an educator and political figure in Ontario. He represented Huron North in the Legislative Assembly of Ontario from 1908 to 1918 as a Conservative member.

He was born in Pickering township, the son of John Musgrove and Mary A. Armstrong, both natives of Ireland. In 1881, Musgrove married Margaret Simpson. He was a school teacher and principal. Musgrove was defeated when he ran for the Huron East seat in the Ontario assembly in 1890.

His brother George also served in the assembly. He died at Wingham, Ontario in March 1940 and was buried at Wingham Cemetery.

References 

1854 births
1940 deaths
Progressive Conservative Party of Ontario MPPs
Canadian Methodists
Canadian schoolteachers
People from Pickering, Ontario
Canadian people of Irish descent
People from Wingham, Ontario